Abdoulaye Sadji (1910 in Rufisque, Senegal – 25 December 1961 in Dakar) was a Senegalese writer and teacher. The son of a Muslim priest, a marabout, Sadji was educated in a Quranic school before attending French schools. After training as a teacher at the École Normale William Ponty in Gorée he became one of the first African high school teachers, working in various parts of Senegal. In 1932 he became only the second Senegalese person to earn a bachelor's degree.

In the 1950s, Sadji worked for a radio station in Dakar and in 1953, together with Léopold Sédar Senghor, he wrote a reading-book for the elementary school. This book, La Belle Histoire de Leuk-le-Lièvre, preserves traditional Senegalese oral tales and is regarded as a classic collection of traditional stories from Africa. As one of the founders of Négritude, Senghor referred to Sadji as one of the pioneering practitioners of the values associated with Négritude.

Sadji published two novels, Maïmouna: petite fille noire (1953) and Nini, mulâtresse du Sénégal (1954), along with a number of short stories, of which "Tounka" (1952) and "Modou-Fatim" (1960) are the best-known. His works often revolve around young girls from the countryside who are trying to adapt to a life in the city.

References 
 Curry, Ginette. "Toubab La!": Literary Representations of Mixed-race Characters in the African Diaspora.Cambridge Scholars Pub., Newcastle, England.2007 .

Notes 

1910 births
1961 deaths
Senegalese novelists
People of French West Africa
People from Rufisque